The van de Velde maps of Palestine and Jerusalem were an important scientific mapping of the region of Palestine and mapping of Jerusalem, published in 1858 by Dutch cartographer Charles William Meredith van de Velde.

The surveys were carried out by Van de Velde during his 1851 visit to Palestine, where he carried out various surveys, drawings, paintings and around one hundred watercolours for postcards. 

After his trip, he held lectures on Palestine in Geneva and Lausanne.

Together with the maps, Van de Velde published an album of 100 lithographs of the region.

Van de Velde met Titus Tobler in Switzerland in 1855, where they agreed to make a new map of Jerusalem based on combining Tobler's own measurements with the flawed Royal Engineers map of 1840–41. Tobler published a 26-page memoir to accompany the map.

The map was published in 1858 ahead of his later Map of the Holy Land.
Van de Velde carried out the work alone with a 7-inch surveyor’s compass, without theodolites (which required multiple people to operate) and without making astronomical observations (which required significant time). Despite this, his map was considered the most accurate made at the time. 

When he returned from his trip to Palestine, he was able to obtain the 1840 Royal Engineers’ survey data, and used this in the production of this maps. Given the known flaws in the work, Van de Velde used the Royal Engineers’ raw data to construct his map, cross-comparing the data with his work as well as all known previous geographical and cartographical knowledge. 

Yehoshua Ben-Arieh stated that: “Ritter’s writing and van de Velde’s map together may be considered the crowning achievements of fifty years exploration and research in the geography of Palestine.”

Faehndrich wrote that: “van de Velde’s map represented the complete body of Western geographical knowledge on Palestine, critically compiled, then verified on site and completed by his own measurements and his own (physical) experience, including the hardships needed to make a scientific map”. 

4,409 copies of the regional maps and 612 copies of the Jerusalem map were sold between 1858 and 1877.

Gallery

Views

Composite Maps

Regional Maps

Bibliography

Primary sources

Secondary sources

References

Old maps of Jerusalem
19th-century maps and globes
Maps of Palestine (region)